The VT100 code page is a character encoding used to represent text on the Classic Mac OS for compatibility with the VT100 terminal. It encodes 256 characters, the first 128 of which are identical to ASCII, with the remaining characters including mathematical symbols, diacritics, and additional punctuation marks. It is suitable for English and several other Western languages. It is similar to Mac OS Roman, but includes all characters in ISO 8859-1 except for the currency sign (which was superseded by the euro sign), the no-break space, and the soft hyphen. It also includes all characters in DEC Special Graphics (code page 1090), except for the new line and no-break space controls. The VT100 encoding is only used on the VT100 font on the Classic Mac OS, and is not an official Mac OS character encoding.

Codepage layout 

The following table shows how characters are encoded in the VT100 character set. Each character is shown with its Unicode equivalent.

References

Encodings